Chilochroma interlinealis is a moth in the family Crambidae. It was described by Harrison Gray Dyar Jr. in 1917. It is found in Guyana and Venezuela.

References

Moths described in 1917
Pyraustinae